Galina Stepanova (born 26 February 1958) is a Soviet rower. She competed in the women's coxless pair event at the 1980 Summer Olympics.

References

1958 births
Living people
Soviet female rowers
Olympic rowers of the Soviet Union
Rowers at the 1980 Summer Olympics
Place of birth missing (living people)